Vexillum boutillieri is an extinct species of sea snail, a marine gastropod mollusk, in the family Costellariidae, the ribbed miters.

Description
The length of the shell attains 11.5 mm, its diameter 4.5 mm.

Distribution
Fossils of this marine species were found in Eocene strata in Ile-de-France, France.

References

 Le Renard, J. & Pacaud, J. (1995). Révision des mollusques Paléogènes du Bassin de Paris. II. Liste des références primaires des espèces. Cossmanniana. 3: 65–132.

External links
 Cossmann M. (1889). Catalogue illustré des coquilles fossiles de l'Éocène des environs de Paris. Annales de la Société Royale Malacologique de Belgique. 24: 3-381, pl. 1-12

boutillieri
Gastropods described in 1889